The Permanent Peoples' Tribunal is an international human rights organization founded in Bologna, Italy, on June 24, 1979, at the initiative of Senator Lelio Basso. It was formed at the final session of the Russell Tribunal as a vehicle to condemn the brutality of Latin American dictatorships. The court is composed of a president, four vice-presidents, a secretary general and 66 international members. Since its establishment, the Tribunal has held 46 sessions dealing with numerous cases of human rights violations in many countries.

History and functions 
The Permanent Peoples' Tribunal (PPT) began in Bologna in 1979 as a direct continuation of the experience of the Russell Tribunal II with Latin American dictatorships (1974–1976). It was promoted by Lelio Basso to denounce the crimes committed by the military regimes of the region. It soon became a permanent forum of complaint for communities experiencing the absence and impotence of international law. 

The PPT is a grass-root initiative to create an independent tool for researching and promoting the process of liberation and justice for marginalized and oppressed groups. Just as the Russell Tribunal, the existence of the Permanent People's Tribunal is due to the failures of a competent international court to effectively prosecute crimes against humanity. 

The International Criminal Court, founded in 1998, with much larger resources, should have addressed some of the functions carried out by the PPT, but it has often proven either too slow or simply unwilling to perform its functions. The PPT therefore is a means to push judicial courts based on intergovernmental treaties, such as the International Criminal Court and the International Court of Justice,  to do more and reinforce their impartiality.

In terms of competences, the PPT goes beyond the recognition of individual criminal responsibility in order to assess also the responsibility of states, of business corporations and of international organizations. Its aim is to record violations faithfully and push for reparations.

The work of the TPP is based on the principles expressed in the Universal Declaration of the Rights of Peoples proclaimed in Algiers in 1976 and the main international instruments protecting human rights. The historical and geographical context of the Declaration, known as the Charter of Algiers, clearly links the general principles of the Declaration for the liberation struggles—which Resolution 1514 (XV) of the United Nations of 14 December 1960 had already put under the protection of international law—with the understanding that the right to self-determination could not be proclaimed as fulfilled and that it did not involve only the political phase of decolonization.

The scope of the concept of self-determination expressed in the Charter of Algiers must relate to the context and the principle of "freedom" which is not limited to a particular time and place and has, in this case, not an individual but a collective subject which is precisely, the people. In the Charter of Algiers and, therefore, in the Permanent People's Tribunal, the principle of self-determination serves as legal support and target indicator of the struggles of peoples whose sovereignty is at risk due to external and internal forces the Tribunal has documented from 1979 to date. As is the case with the principle of self-determination, the concept of people in the Charter of Algiers is not unique, but rather presents a contextual or political significance not limited to a strict definition by the Declaration, but left to the free interpretation of those who, now and then, have used its principles over the years. According to the Charter, peoples are important collective subjects  but marginalized by a law designed for States as the only recipients of rights, including the individual and collective dimensions in a single legal system serving both individuals and peoples.

The peoples in the history of the TPP belong to different groups with different needs, aspirations and real tragedies, which control the materiality and binding force of an international law continuing to be fragile. The original idea of the Russell Tribunal II and the TPP lies in the awareness that the formal recognition of the principles and rights is the starting point of a process of liberation in which collective identities, called “Peoples,” are the main actors. This process requires a permanent collective demand for the feasibility and applicability of these principles, recognized in many international law instruments.

Structure
The court is composed of a president (currently Philippe Texier of France) , four vice-presidents, a secretary general (currently Gianni Tognoni of Italy), a coordinations officer (currently Simona Fraudatario of Italy) , and 58 members from 26 countries, from different disciplines such as law, economy, sociology, arts, and literature.

Sessions 
Since its establishment until today, the Tribunal has held 46 sessions on numerous cases of human rights violations. Its specificity, expressed in the TPP's Statute, lies in applied research to cases of crimes against peace and against humanity, to cases of genocide and to crimes—not yet established—attributable to economic and political activities promoting poverty, inequality, exclusion. By observing the chronological development of the meetings, it is evident that the work of the Permanent People's Tribunal is within the evolving framework of international law. The story told in the judgments of TPP traces a map of the last thirty years of the history of peoples and matches many of the most representative ties and challenges for the peoples and the law, in the context of historical situations where States or private actors (transnational corporations) weaken or create obstacles for the intervention of the international law.

The judgments of the TPP rely almost exclusively on sources of existing international law. However, it is important to remember that many of the judgments have gone beyond the mere application of existing rules and have evidenced legal contradictions or gaps, in order to indicate forms of application and commitment of future positive law.

List of sessions

 46. Session on Alleged violations of international law and international humanitarian law by the Turkish Republic and its officials against the Kurdish people and their organizations (Paris 2018)
 45. Session on the violation of human rights of migrants and refugee people (2017–2018)
 44. Permanent Peoples Tribunal on Human Rights of Migrant and Refugee Peoples (Launched Barcelona 2017, on-going Session)
 43. Myanmar's crimes against the Rohingya and Kachin Peoples I (London, 2017)
 42. Living wage for Asian garment workers as fundamental human right (Sri Lanka 2011; Cambodia 2012; India 2012; Indonesia 2014; Sri Lanka 2015)
 41. Fundamental rights, local community participation and infrastructure projects (Torino-Almese, 5–8 November 2015)
 40. Session on the Canadian mining transnational corporations (on-going)
 39. Sri Lanka and the Tamil People II (Bremen, 7–10 December 2013)
 38. Free trade, violence, impunity and people's rights in Mexico  (Mexico, 2011–2014)
 37. Session on agrochemical transnational corporations (Bangalore, 3–6 December 2011)
 36. Sri Lanka and the Tamil People I (Dublin, 14–16 January 2010)
 35. Transnational corporations and the rights of peoples in Colombia (Colombia, 2006–2008)
 34. The Philippines II (The Hague, 21–25 March 2007)
 33. The European Union and transnational corporations in Latin America: policies, instruments and actors complicity in the violation of peoples' rights (Madrid, 14–17 May 2010)
 32. Human rights violations in Algeria, 1992–2004 (Paris, 5–8 November 2004)
 31. International Law and the new wars (Roma, 14–16 December 2002)
 30. Global multinationals and "human distorted" (Warwick, 22–23 March 2000)
 29. Elf-Aquitaine (Paris, 19–21 May 1999)
 28. Violations of the fundamental rights of children and adolescents in Brazil (São Paulo, 17–19 March 1999)
 27. The rights of workers and consumers in the garment industry (Brussels, 30 April-5 May 1998)
 26. Chernobyl: environment, health and human rights (Vienna, 12–15 April 1996)
 25. Violations of the fundamental rights of children and minors (Trento, 27–29 March; Macerata, 30 March; Napoli 1–4 April 1995)
 24. Crimes against humanity in the former Yugoslavia II (Barcelona, 7–11 December 1995)
 23. Crimes against humanity in the former Yugoslavia I (Bern, 17–20 February 1995)
 22. Asylum right in Europe  (Berlin, 8–12 December 1994)
 21. Industrial risks and human rights II (London, 28 November – 2 December 1994)
 20. Industrial risks and human rights I (Bhopal, 19–23 October 1992)
 19. Tibet (Strasburg, 16–20 November 1992)
 18. The conquest of and international law (Padua-Venice, 5–8 October 1992)
 17. Impunity for crimes against humanity in Latin America (Bogotá, 22–25 April 1991)
 16. Brazilian Amazon (Paris, 12–16 October 1990)
 15. Porto-Rico (Barcelona, 27–29 January 1989)
 14. The policies of the International Monetary Fund and the World Bank II (Madrid, 1–3 October 1994)
 13. The policies of the International Monetary Fund and the World Bank I (Berlin, 26–29 September 1988)
 12. The interventions of the United States in Nicaragua (Brussels, 5–8 October 1984)
 11. Armenian Genocide (Paris, 13–16 April 1984)
 10. Guatemala (Madrid, 27–31 January 1983)
 9.  Zaire (Rotterdam, 18–20 September 1982)
 8. Timor Orientale (Lisbon, 19–21 June 1981)
 7. Afghanistan Il (Paris, 16–20 December 1982)
 6. Afghanistan I (Stockholm, 1–3 May 1981)
 5. El Salvador (Mexico, 9–12 February 1981)
 4. The Philippines and the Bangsamoro people (Anvers, 30 October-3 November 1980)
 3. Eritrea (Milano, 24–26 May 1980)
 2. Argentina (Genève, 3–4 May 1980)
 1. Western Sahara (Brussels, 10–11 November 1979)

See also 
 Tibetan sovereignty debate

References

External links 
 Permanent Peoples' Tribunal

Organizations established in 1979
Human rights organisations based in Italy
Organisations based in Bologna
People's Tribunal